The 1920 United States presidential election in New York took place on November 2, 1920. All contemporary 48 states were part of the 1920 United States presidential election. Voters chose 45 electors to the Electoral College, which selected the president and vice president.

New York was won by Republican Senator Warren G. Harding of Ohio, who was running against Democratic Ohio Governor James M. Cox. Harding’s running mate was Governor Calvin Coolidge of Massachusetts, while Cox ran with Assistant Secretary of the Navy Franklin D. Roosevelt of New York. Also running that year was Socialist candidate Eugene V. Debs of Indiana and his running mate Seymour Stedman of Illinois.

Harding won New York State with an overwhelming landslide of 64.56% of the vote to Cox’s 26.95%, a victory margin of 37.61%. Socialist Party candidate Eugene Debs finished with a relatively strong showing for a third party candidate, taking 7.01% of the vote, more than twice his national vote share, making New York his third strongest state in the nation. The strongest county for Debs within the state was the New York City borough of the Bronx, where Debs broke 15% of the vote.

With the deeply unpopular Democratic administration of Woodrow Wilson as the backdrop for the 1920 campaign, Warren G. Harding promised a “return to normalcy” that appealed to many voters, while Cox was tied to the policies of the Wilson administration, which had even in 1916 been criticized for insensitivity to Irish-American wishes. Harding won nationally in one of the most decisive landslides in American history, and New York, already a fiercely Republican state during the Fourth Party System, went even harder for Harding than the nation, making New York a solid 12% more Republican than the national average. The Irish-Americans were offended by Cox’ close ties to Wilson’s proposed League of Nations; whilst Palatine Germans who had been the Democratic Party’s other base in the Empire State since before the Civil War were similarly offended by Wilson’s pro-British policies. Schoharie County, which had been the only New York county to stay Democratic during the “free silver” election of 1896, went Republican for the first time ever and has only twice voted Democratic since.

Harding swept every county in the state of New York, winning every upstate county as well as winning all five boroughs of New York City and Long Island. All but five of New York State’s 62 counties went Republican with more than 60% of the vote.

Harding won heavily populated New York City as a whole with a commanding majority, sweeping all 5 boroughs. Harding received over 60% of the vote in the boroughs of Brooklyn, Queens, and Staten Island, and also won majorities in Manhattan and the Bronx. 1920 was the first of only two occasions in which a Republican presidential candidate has won all 5 boroughs of New York City since the city’s incorporation in 1898, the other occasion being 1924. Likewise, this was the first of only two occasions (the other being 1924) in which a Republican has won the boroughs of Manhattan and the Bronx since they took their modern forms with the creation of Bronx County in 1914.

Finally, since the city's incorporation, 1920 remains the only election ever in which a Republican presidential candidate has won an absolute majority of the vote in all five boroughs as well as in New York City as a whole. In 1924, Calvin Coolidge would win New York City for the GOP once more, but with a plurality, and beginning in 1928, the city would become a Democratic stronghold that no Republican has since been able to win. As of 2020, this is the most recent election where New York's most Democratic county was not one of the five boroughs of New York City, as Cox had his best performance in Upstate Rensselaer County.

Harding also won decisive majorities in upstate New York in rural and urban counties. Harding won over 60% in Albany County, home to the state capital of Albany, as well as in Erie County, home to the city of Buffalo, and in Monroe County, home to the city of Rochester. 1920 made Warren G. Harding the first of three presidential candidates of either party who has been able to sweep every county in New York State, the only others being Republican Calvin Coolidge in 1924 and Democrat Lyndon Johnson in 1964.

Harding's 64.56% of the vote in New York State remains the highest vote share any Republican presidential candidate has ever received in the state, and the second-highest vote share any candidate of either party has ever gotten in the state, beaten only by Democrat Lyndon Johnson’s 68.56% in the Democratic landslide of 1964. Harding’s landslide victory margin of 37.61% remains the widest margin by which any candidate of either party has ever won New York State, beating even Lyndon Johnson's 37.25% in 1964.

Results

Results by county

See also
 United States presidential elections in New York
 Presidency of Warren G. Harding
 Presidency of Calvin Coolidge

Notes

References

New York
1920
1920 New York (state) elections